Sergei Savvich Volchkov (1707–1773) was a Russian printer, lexicographer, translator.

Volchkov made the first major Russian translations of Baltasar Gracian and Montaigne, and was assigned to the Imperial Academy of Sciences in 1736.

Selected works
Teusch- Lateinisch- und Ruszisches Lexicon, Ehrenreich Weissmann, Sergei Savvich Volchkov - 1731

References

1707 births
1773 deaths
Place of birth missing
Place of death missing
Russian lexicographers
Russian printers
Russian translators
18th-century translators
18th-century lexicographers